Imagine is the third studio album (sixth overall) by American singer Eva Cassidy. Released in 2002, six years after her death, it peaked on the U.S. Billboard Top 200 at No. 32, and was her second U.K. No. 1 album.

Track listing

Personnel

Production

Charts

Certifications

References

Eva Cassidy albums
2002 albums
Albums published posthumously